Harold Edwards Urness (June 23, 1937 – December 29, 2018) was an offensive lineman for the Saskatchewan Roughriders from 1961 to 1970.

CFL career
Urness played in three Grey Cups for the Roughriders, winning one in 1966, the 54th Grey Cup against the Ottawa Rough Riders, losing two, the 55th Grey Cup of 1967 against the Hamilton Tiger-Cats, and the 57th Grey Cup of 1969 against Ottawa again. Except for his rookie year, he and the Roughriders never missed the playoffs. Urness was an All-Star center six years in a row and was inducted into the Canadian Football Hall of Fame in 1989.

Al Urness, Ted’s father, spent seven seasons with the then-Regina Roughriders. Beginning in 1928, he played for the team in five consecutive Grey Cup games. Al’s brother, Harold Urness, played for the Riders in 1930 and 1931. Fred Goodman, Ted’s uncle, was a member of the Roughriders from 1929 to 1933. Jack Urness, Ted’s brother, was a quarterback with the Roughriders of 1958 and 1959. On November 26, 1989, Ted and his son Mark Urness (5 years with the Riders) became the team’s first father-son Grey Cup championship duo.

Post-football career

After football, Ted served as the Chairman for the Saskatchewan Liquor Control Board, and long serving General Manager for Redhead Equipment in Saskatoon.

He died on December 29, 2018, at the age of 81.

References

External links

1937 births
2018 deaths
Arizona Wildcats football players
Canadian Football Hall of Fame inductees
Canadian football offensive linemen
Sportspeople from Regina, Saskatchewan
Players of Canadian football from Saskatchewan
Saskatchewan Roughriders players